How to Build a Better Boy is a Disney Channel Original Movie directed by Paul Hoen and written by Jason Mayland. It stars China Anne McClain, Kelli Berglund and Marshall Williams. The first images were shown during a promo for Disney Channel's Summer 2014, while the first promo aired on June 27, 2014 during the premiere of the Disney Channel Original Movie Zapped. The film premiered on August 15, 2014. The movie premiered on Disney Channel UK on September 19, 2014.

Plot

Mae Hartley and Gabby Harrison are intelligent tenth graders. Mae has a crush on a jock named Jaden and thinks that he is going to invite her to the Homecoming dance. However, she is publicly humiliated by Nevaeh, a mean cheerleader girl who is already going with Jaden. In her embarrassment, Mae claims that she already has a boyfriend. To cover the lie, Gabby offers to program a virtual boyfriend for Mae using computer software known as X-17, which they believe is used by Mae's father, Dr. James Hartley, to design high definition video game characters for his company. Gabby successfully creates a virtual boyfriend according to Mae's direction, and Mae names him Albert.

The software goes haywire and short circuits James' computer. Mae's brother Bart agrees to fix the computer if Gabby will go to homecoming with him. The next morning, Albert actually arrives at school and becomes popular among the students. Albert is able to speed read and throw/kick harder than normal humans. Bart and Gabby learn that she created a robot soldier and hacked into the Pentagon to do so. They also learn that James actually works for the Pentagon. General McFee discovers the X-17 prototype robot soldier, who is Albert, is missing.

Later that day, Albert asks Mae to Homecoming. Feeling overwhelmed, she tries to explain to Albert that she does not feel like she deserves to be his girlfriend. Gabby and Mae talk privately. Gabby thinks the whole thing is getting out of hand and Albert is coming between them. Mae eventually agrees to go with Albert to the dance.

At the Hartley house, Bart and Gabby witness Zephyr, Weevil and Pox, members of the international arms dealer group Black Sigma, breaking into the house in search of the prototype soldier. During a school football game, Gabby unsuccessfully tries to warn Mae about Albert being a robot soldier, but the two get into an argument. Albert is chosen to play in the game and helps the team stage a comeback. Army soldiers led by McFee arrive at the game following an EMP-caused power outage caused by Black Sigma that short circuits Albert's wiring.

The Black Sigma members are captured by the army and Albert begins a global mission to fight danger. Mae and Gabby are told by McFee that they must forget about Albert's existence. Mae is upset, but she believes that Albert will still arrive for the homecoming dance, and James is surprised when he does. McFee tells James that the army has known all along that Albert would return for the homecoming dance. McFee plans to retrieve Albert, but James convinces him to wait until Albert completes his mission, which is to kiss Mae at the dance. McFee and the army lead a mission to make the night perfect for Albert and Mae, which includes stuffing the ballot box to make them the homecoming king and queen.

Nevaeh tries to ruin Mae's night but is dumped by Jaden in the process. When Mae is crowned homecoming queen, she feels conflicted, while Nevaeh is disappointed. Jaden tells Gabby and Bart that he originally intended to ask Mae to homecoming, but was not brave enough to do so. Gabby and Mae reconcile.

Mae and Albert dance, but as he attempts to kiss her, she backs away and reveals that even though the moment is perfect, it does not feel right. Mae realizes she wants a relationship with a real boy who is not perfectly manipulated. Albert is impressed by her emotional depth. He points out that the army is here to retrieve him, and Mae fulfills his request to initiate his self-destruct after he tells her that it is what he wants. Albert bids her goodbye and begins to pulsate with lights. Gabby, Mae, and the guests watch as Albert breaks out of the venue through the ceiling and is destroyed.

Bart covers and thanks Principal Fragner for the 'awesome special effects'. The party continues, and Jaden asks Mae out. She tells him she will reply later. Mae and Gabby are excited that Jaden told Mae how he feels, but Mae says no boy will get in the way of their friendship. However, Gabby reveals that she has changed her mind about boys and is now dating Bart.

Cast
 China Anne McClain as Gabby Harrison
 Kelli Berglund as Mae Hartley
 Marshall Williams as Albert Banks / X-17
 Matt Shively as Bart Hartley
 Ashley Argota as Nevaeh Barnes
 Noah Centineo as Jaden Stark
 Ron Lea as General McFee
 Roger Bart as Dr. James Hartley
 Sasha Clements as Marnie
 Ieve Lucas as Major Jenks
 Paulino Nunes as Zephyr
 Matthew G. Taylor as Weevil
 Alex Karzis as Pox
 Richard McMillan as Principal Fragner
 Martin Roach as Coach Voss
 Helen Johns as Computer Voice

Songs
 Sabrina Carpenter – "Stand Out"
Marshall Williams and Kelli Berglund – "Love You like a Love Song" (Selena Gomez and the Scene cover)
 Mo' Cheddah feat. Cristina Renae – "Higher"
China Anne McClain and Kelli Berglund – "Something Real"

Production
Production began in Toronto, Ontario, Canada, and was filmed at North Toronto Collegiate Institute primarily. It is directed by Paul Hoen, executive produced by Robin Schorr and Adam Kossack, co-executive produced by Dan Seligmann and written by Jason Mayland.

Release

Broadcast
The film was originally released on Watch Disney Channel on August 11, 2014. It premiered on August 15, 2014 on Disney Channel in the United States and Family Channel in Canada. Ariana Grande's music video for "Break Free" also aired on Disney Channel during the movie as well as new episodes of Dog With a Blog and Girl Meets World following and preceding the movie. Disney Channel (Netherlands & Flanders) has an airdate of September 6, 2014.  Disney Channel (UK & Ireland) has a release date of September 19, 2014. The film aired in Turkey on Moviemax Family on November 22, 2015.

International titles
The film was released under the following titles in international markets:

Cómo crear el chico ideal in Latin America
El Chico Ideal in Spain
Le Garçon Idéal in France
O rapaz Ideal in Portugal
Robot Sevgilim in Turkey

Reception
The August 15, 2014 premiere airing of How to Build a Better Boy on Disney Channel drew 4.6 million viewers.

Music
American singers China Anne McClain and Kelli Berglund recorded the song "Something Real" from the movie. It was released as a digital download in 2014 by Walt Disney Records.

Awards and nominations

References

External links

 

2014 television films
2014 films
Disney Channel Original Movie films
Films directed by Paul Hoen
Films shot in Toronto
American teen comedy films
American teen romance films
2010s teen comedy films
2010s science fiction comedy films
2014 romantic comedy films
American science fiction television films
Android (robot) films
Films about artificial intelligence
Films set in Washington, D.C.
2010s American films